is a stop on the Setagaya Line by Tokyu Corporation and is located in Segataya, Tokyo, Japan.

Station layout
There are two side platforms on two tracks.

Surroundings
Akamatsu Park

History

References

Tokyu Setagaya Line
Stations of Tokyu Corporation
Railway stations in Tokyo
Railway stations in Japan opened in 1949